Richard Wayne Peck (April 10, 1934 – May 23, 2018) was an American novelist known for his prolific contributions to modern young adult literature. He was awarded the Newbery Medal in 2001 for his novel A Year Down Yonder (the sequel to A Long Way From Chicago). For his cumulative contribution to young-adult literature, he received the Margaret A. Edwards Award from the American Library Association in 1990.

Early life 

Richard Wayne Peck was born on April 5, 1934, in Illinois to Virginia Grey Peck and Wayne Peck. His mother was a Wesleyan University graduate, and his father owned a service station. His sister, Cheryl, would later become an administrator at a college. He attended elementary and high school in Decatur, Illinois.

Peck earned a bachelor's degree in English at DePauw University in 1956. He spent his junior year abroad at the University of Exeter.

After college, he was drafted into the US Army as a chaplain's assistant and spent two years serving in Stuttgart, Germany. In a 2003 interview he commented, "I think your view of the world goes on—for the rest of your life—as the world you saw as you emerged into it as an adult."

After his military service ended, he completed a master's degree at Southern Illinois University in 1959.

Career
Peck worked as a high school teacher, but much to his dismay, was transferred to a junior high school to teach English. After a while, he decided to cut his career short and write. However, these observations about junior high school students proved to be inspiring material for his books. He said, "Ironically, it was my students who taught me to be a writer, though I was hired to teach them."

He left teaching in 1971 to write his first novel, Don't Look and It Won't Hurt, published by Holt, Rinehart and Winston in 1972, in which "A teenage girl struggles to understand her place within her family and in the world." He wrote a book each year since then totaling 41 books in 41 years.

Peck was an adjunct professor with Louisiana State University's School of Library and Information Sciences.

Personal life
In a 2001 profile, family friend Marc Talbert described Peck as a person "who is fastidious about what he allows others to know about himself. He knew, respected, and honored personal boundaries in ways that are refreshing for someone who grew up in the sixties and seventies, when every little personal thing was fair game." However, when The Best Man was published in 2016, Peck spoke about marriage equality in the United States from his perspective as a gay man who had grown up in a time when homosexuality was punishable by law.

He lived in New York and divided his time between writing and traveling. Peck died in New York City in May 2018 at age 84.

Quotes

"The only way you can write is by the light of the bridges burning behind you." — Richard Peck, at a PEN panel in New York City, February 8, 2010 

"Ironically, it was my students who taught me to be a writer, though I had been hired to teach them," Peck said in a speech published in Arkansas Libraries. "They taught me that a novel must entertain first before it can be anything else. I learned that there is no such thing as a 'grade reading level'; a young person's 'reading level' and attention span will rise and fall according to his degree of interest. I learned that if you do not have a happy ending for the young, you had better do some fast talking."

"You never write about yourself; you just always wind up having written about yourself." — October 10, 2013, to a library full of 4th graders in Pleasanton, California 

"Nobody, but a reader, ever became a writer."

Writer

Peck wrote exclusively on a typewriter, described here in 'Publishers Weekly':
When the author is not traveling, he works at an L-shaped desk, which affords a sunny window. He writes everything on an electric typewriter because "it has to be a book from the first day," he explains. He has no daily routine because of all the traveling he does, but follows a very disciplined writing process. He writes each page six times, then places it in a three-ring binder with a DePauw University cover ("a talisman," he calls this memento from his alma mater). When he feels that he has gotten a page just right, he takes out another 20 words. "After a year, I've come to the end. Then I'll take this first chapter, and without rereading it, I'll throw it away and write the chapter that goes at the beginning. Because the first chapter is the last chapter in disguise." He always hands in a completed manuscript, and his editor is his first reader.

Peck refused to embrace new technology, instead choosing to type his material on a typewriter.

Peck believed each book should be a question, not an answer. He also believed that before anything else can happen, a book needs to be entertaining, which lead him to write many award-winning novels.

His collected papers written between 1972 and 1991 reside at The University of Southern Mississippi.

Death

Richard Peck died on May 23, 2018, at his home in New York City after a long battle with cancer.

Film adaptations

 The Ghost Belonged to Me (1976), from the 1975 novel
 Are You in the House Alone? (1978 made-for-TV thriller film), from the 1976 novel
 Child of Glass (1978 TV movie), from The Ghost Belonged to Me (1976)
 Father Figure (1980), from the 1978 novel
 Gas Food Lodging (1992), from Don't Look and It Won't Hurt (1971)

Works

Anthologies edited
 Edge of Awareness: 25 Contemporary Essays, eds. Ned E. Hoopes and Peck (Laurel Leaf Library, 1966)
 Sounds and Silences: Poems For Now (Delacorte Press, 1970)
 Mindscapes: Poems for the Real World (Delacorte, 1971)
 Leap Into Reality: Essays For Now (Laurel Leaf, 1973)
 Pictures That Storm Inside My Head: Poems for the Inner You (Avon Books, 1976)

Collections
 Past Perfect, Present Tense: New and Collected Stories (Dial, 2004)

Novels
Several of these books have the subtitle "a novel".

Don't Look and It Won't Hurt (1972)
Dreamland Lake (1973)
Through a Brief Darkness (1973)
Representing Super Doll (1974)
  The Ghost Belonged to Me (1975)
 Are You in the House Alone? (1976)
 Ghosts I Have Been (1977)
Monster Night at Grandma's House, illus. Don Freeman (1977)
 Father Figure (1978)
Secrets of the Shopping Mall (1979)
 Amanda/Miranda (1980)
Close Enough to Touch (1981)
New York Time
 The Dreadful Future of Blossom Culp (1983)
This Family of Women (1983)
  Remembering the Good Times (1985)
Blossom Culp and the Sleep of Death (1986)
 Princess Ashley (1987) 
Those Summer Girls I Never Met (1988)
 Voices After Midnight (1989) 
Unfinished Portrait of Jessica (1991)
Bel-Air Bambi and the Mall Rats (1993)
 Lost in Cyberspace! (1995) 
The Last Safe Place on Earth (1995)
The Great Interactive Dream Machine: Another Adventure in Cyberspace (1996) 
London Holiday (1998)
   A Long Way from Chicago (1998)
 Strays Like Us (1998)
   A Year Down Yonder (2000)
   Fair Weather (2001)
   The River Between Us (2003)
   The Teacher's Funeral: A Comedy in Three Parts (2004)
  Here Lies The Librarian (2006)
  On the Wings of Heroes (2007)
  A Season of Gifts, illus. Brandon Dorman (2009)
Three Quarters Dead (2010) 
Secrets at Sea, illus. Kelly Murphy (2011) 
The Mouse with the Question Mark Tail, illus. Kelly Murphy (2013) 
  The Best Man (2016)

Nonfiction
 Consumer's guide to educational innovations, Mortimer Smith, Peck, and George Weber (Washington: Council for Basic Education, 1972)
 The Creative Word, Vol. 2, Peck and Stephen N. Judy (Random House English series, Random House Schoolbook Division, 1973)
 Transitions: a literary paper casebook (Random House English, 1974)
 Urban Studies: a research paper casebook (Random House English, 1974)
 Housing and Local Government: a research guide for policy-makers and planners, Harry J. Wexler and Peck (Lexington, MA: Lexington Books, 1975)
 Write a Tale of Terror (O'Fallon, MO: Book Lures, 1987)
 Anonymously Yours (Englewood Cliffs, NJ: J. Messner, 1991), autobiography
 Love and Death at the Mall: Teaching and Writing for the Literate Young (Delacorte, 1994)
 Invitations to the World: Teaching and Writing for the Young (Dial, 2002)
.

Awards and honors

1990: Margaret A. Edwards Award for "significant and lasting contributions to young adult literature"
1990: ALAN Award, from The Assembly on Literature for Adolescents, for "outstanding contributions to the field of adolescent literature"
1991: The University of Southern Mississippi Medallion for "outstanding contributions to the field of children's literature"
2001: National Humanities Medal
2004: Jeremiah Ludington Memorial Award, from the Educational Paperback Association, for "significant contribution to the educational paperback business"

Book awards

1977: Edgar Allan Poe Award, Best Juvenile, Are You in the House Alone?
2001: Newbery Medal, A Year Down Yonder
2004 Scott O'Dell Award for Historical Fiction The River Between Us

Other book recognition
1974: Edgar Award nominee, Best Juvenile, Dreamland Lake
1999: National Book Award finalist and Newbery Medal Honor Book, A Long Way from Chicago
2017: Boston Globe–Horn Book Award Fiction and Poetry Honor Book, The Best Man

Notes

References

Further reading
 Gallo, Donald R. and Wendy J. Glenn. Richard Peck: The Past is Paramount. 2nd ed. revised. Scarecrow Press, Inc. 2008. . (Google Books selection) 
 Sommers, Michael A. Richard Peck (Library of author biographies). New York: Rosen Pub. Group. 2004.

External links

Children's Author/Illustrator Biographies: Richard Peck from the Educational Paperback Association
"Books for the Readers of the 21st Century by Richard Peck", The Ezra Jack Keats Lecture, March 24, 2000
 Scholastic.com: Authors & Books: Richard Peck's Interview Transcript interview by students 
 Richard Peck at Scholastic Teachers 
Featured Author: Richard Peck at Carol Hurst's Children's Literature Site
 
 

1934 births
2018 deaths
American children's writers
American writers of young adult literature
DePauw University alumni
Edgar Award winners
Louisiana State University faculty
Margaret A. Edwards Award winners
Military personnel from Illinois
National Humanities Medal recipients
Deaths from cancer in New York (state)
Newbery Honor winners
Newbery Medal winners
Southern Illinois University alumni
Writers from Decatur, Illinois